Milk Bar Pie is a dessert created by Christina Tosi while working at wd~50. It is the signature dish of Tosi's Milk Bar.

Development 
Tosi first created the dessert as one of her offerings for family meal while working at wd~50. She describes regularly making desserts from "whatever mise-en-place was left over from the previous night's service". Confronted one morning with "nothing interesting at all" to work with, she came across a recipe for chess pie in Joy of Cooking; Tosi describes chess pie as something "the old gals of yesteryear made when there was nothing to really make pie out of". She substituted heavy cream for the called-for buttermilk to create a gooier consistency and corn powder and milk powder for the called-for flour to create a more interesting flavor. The pie, originally called Crack Pie, was a hit at family meals.

Milk Bar 
When Tosi opened Momofuku Milk Bar in 2008, she revised the dish again to include an oatmeal-cookie crust. 

The dish became the bakery's signature offering; according to Vice, "Tosi’s Milk Bar has been synonymous with the Crack Pie". Gourmet called it her "defining dessert". Bon Appetit called it her "most buzzed-about dish". New York Daily News called it "New York's Favorite sugar high." In December 2009, Anderson Cooper appeared on Regis and Kelly discussing the pie, at the time named Crack Pie. The New York Times called the appearance a "seminal moment".

The Los Angeles Times in 2010 called out the price of the pie, then $44, as "jaw-dropping"; it attributed the pie's having "taken New York City by storm" partially to the price. Axios in 2022 called the dish a "cult favorite".

Name change 
Some food writers and others have criticized naming foods, including Crack Pie, after addictive substances as insensitive and offensive. In May of 2019, Devra First of the Boston Globe specifically called out Crack Pie, criticizing the pie's name in a column entitled "There's Nothing Cute About Crack Pie", for making light of addiction by alluding to the addictiveness of crack cocaine. The following month, Milk Bar changed the name to Milk Bar pie.

Cookbook 
Tosi's first cookbook, Momofuku Milk Bar (2011), published by Clarkson Potter, contains a recipe for the dish.

References 

Pies
Desserts